News Watch (also expressed as Newswatch or NewsWatch) is a name or brand associated with the following:
 NewsWatch 15, a regional cable television channel in New Orleans, Louisiana, US
 NewsWatch (branding), a branding used for local newscasts in the United States and Canada
 NewsWatch 12, the newscast branding for KDRV in Medford, Oregon, US
 Newswatch 13, the newscast branding for KVTV in Laredo, Texas, US
 NewsWatch 24, the newscast branding for WATN-TV in Memphis, Tennessee, US
 Newswatch 16, the newscast branding for WNEP-TV in Scranton, Pennsylvania, US
 Newswatch (British TV programme), a weekly news program on the BBC in the United Kingdom
 News Watch (Indonesian TV series), a news program aired on SCTV in Indonesia
 Newswatch (Nigeria), a news magazine published in Nigeria
 NewsWatch (Philippine TV program), a news program aired on Radio Philippines Network in the Philippines
 NewsWatch Aksyon Balita, the late afternoon news broadcast of Radio Philippines Network in the Philippines
 NewsWatch Junior Edition, installation of NewsWatch aired on Solar TV/Radio Philippines Network
 News Watch (news package), a television news music package by Frank Gari
 News Watch 9, the flagship network television newscast of NHK in Japan
 CBN NewsWatch, the evening newscast for the Christian Broadcasting Network

See also
NewsWatcher, a series of freeware and open source newsreader software